Menachem ben Solomon Meiri or Hameiri (1249–1315) was a famous Catalan rabbi, Talmudist and Maimonidean.

Biography
Menachem Meiri was born in 1249 in Perpignan, which then formed part of the Principality of Catalonia. He was the student of Rabbi Reuven, the son of Chaim of Narbonne, France.

Beit HaBechirah

His commentary, the Beit HaBechirah (literally "The Chosen House," a play on an alternate name for the Temple in Jerusalem, implying that the Meiri's work selects specific content from the Talmud, omitting the discursive elements), is one of the most monumental works written on the Talmud. This work is less a commentary and more of a digest of all of the comments in the Talmud, arranged in a manner similar to the Talmud—presenting first the mishnah and then laying out the discussions that are raised concerning it. Haym Soloveitchik describes it as follows:
Meiri is the only medieval Talmudist (rishon) whose works can be read almost independently of the Talmudic text, upon which it ostensibly comments. The Beit ha-Behirah is not a running commentary on the Talmud. Meiri, in quasi-Maimonidean fashion, intentionally omits the give and take of the sugya, he focuses, rather, on the final upshot of the discussion and presents the differing views of that upshot and conclusion. Also, he alone, and again intentionally, provides the reader with background information. His writings are the closest thing to a secondary source in the library of rishonim.

Unlike most rishonim, he frequently quotes the Jerusalem Talmud, including textual variants which are no longer extant in other sources.

Beit HaBechirah cites many of the major Rishonim, referring to them not by name but rather by distinguished titles. Specifically:
 Gedolei harabbanim - Rashi
 Gedolei hamefarshim - Raavad (or Gedolei hamegihim when quoted as disputing Rambam or Rif)
 Gedolei haposkim - Isaac Alfasi
 Gedolei hamechabrim - Rambam
 Geonei Sefarad - Ri Migash
 Hachmei HaTzarfatim - Rashbam (or, sometimes Rashi)

Historical influence

A complete copy of Beit HaBechira was preserved in the Biblioteca Palatina in Parma, rediscovered in 1920, and subsequently published. Snippets of Beit HaBechirah were published long before the publication of the Parma manuscripts. Nevertheless, the common assumption has been that the Meiri's works were not available to generations of halachists before 1920; as reflected in early 20th century authors such as Chafetz Chaim, Chazon Ish, and Joseph B. Soloveitchik whom write under the assumption that Beit HaBechira was newly discovered in their time.

Beit HaBechira has had much less influence on subsequent halachic development than would have been expected given its stature. Several reasons have been given for this. Some modern poskim refuse to take its arguments into consideration, on the grounds that a work so long unknown (in their opinion) has ceased to be part of the process of halachic development. One source held that the work was ignored due to its unusual length. Professor Haym Soloveitchik, though, suggested that the work was ignored due to its having the character of a secondary source - a genre which, he argues, was not appreciated among Torah learners until the late 20th century.

Other works
Menachem Meiri is also noted for having penned a famous work used to this very day by Jewish scribes, namely, Kiryat Sefer, a two-volume compendium outlining the rules governing the orthography that are to be adhered to when writing Torah scrolls.

He also wrote several minor works, including a commentary to Avot whose introduction includes a recording of the chain of tradition from Moses through the Tanaim.

Halakhic positions

Meiri's commentary is noted for its position on the status of gentiles in Jewish law, asserting that discriminatory laws and statements found in the Talmud applied only to the idolatrous nations of old.

According to J. David Bleich, "the Christianity presented so favorably by Me’iri was not an orthodox Trinitarianism but a Christianity that espoused a theology formally branded heretical by the Church". However, Yaakov Elman argued that Bleich had no sources for this assertion.

See also

Hachmei Provence

References

Bibliography

1249 births
1306 deaths
Provençal Jews
13th-century French writers
French religious writers
13th-century Catalan rabbis
People from Perpignan
French male non-fiction writers
Grammarians of Hebrew
14th-century Catalan rabbis